Alfred Lorenzer (Ulm, April 8, 1922 – Perugia, June 26, 2002) was a German psychoanalyst and sociologist regarded as a pioneer of interdisciplinary psychoanalysis. He integrated the psychological, the biological and the sociological dimension in the science of man, especially with regard to psychoanalytic theory.

References 
 Olesen, Henning Salling, ed. (2013): "Cultural Analysis and In-Depth Hermeneutics." Historical Social Research, Focus, 38, no. 2, pp. 7–157. 
 Leithäuser, Thomas (2013). "Psychoanalysis, Socialization and Society - The Psychoanalyticial Thought and Interpretation of Alfred Lorenzer." Historical Social Research 38, no. 2, pp. 56–70.
 Olesen, Henning Salling and Kirsten Weber (2013): "Socialization, Language, and Scenic Understanding. Alfred Lorenzer's Contribution to a Psycho-Societal Methodology." Historical Social Research 38, no. 2, pp. 26–55.

External links
Tobias Schaffrik, The Work of Alfred Lorenzer

1922 births
2002 deaths
German sociologists
German male writers